Bhonpur is a village that are located near Boinchi in Hooghly district, West Bengal, India. It is under Pandua police station. Approximately it is 3 km apart from this region's main town Boinchi.

Origin of the village name
It is said that a rock came over the soil. Soil is said Bhnui(ভুঁই) in local language. So the village is named Bhonpur.

Education
There are two primary schools and a higher secondary school in Bhonpur. The name of the higher secondary school is Bhonpur Jajneswar Vidyapith(ESTD: 1953). The name of the primary schools are Bhonpur Primary School & Chetua Primary School. There is a B.Ed College in the village. Its name is Binita Mohanta College of Education. It is established in 2013.

Population
Bhonpur is a large village  with total 529 families residing. The Bhonpur village has population of 2410 of which 1195 are males while 1215 are females as per Population Census 2011.

In Bhonpur village population of children with age 0-6 is 235 which makes up 9.75% of total population of village. Average Sex Ratio of Bhonpur village is 1017 which is higher than West Bengal state average of 950. Child Sex Ratio for the Bhonpur as per census is 1217, higher than West Bengal average of 956.

Bhonpur village has lower literacy rate compared to West Bengal. In 2011, literacy rate of Bhonpur village was 67.77% compared to 76.26% of West Bengal. In Bhonpur Male literacy stands at 78.15% while female literacy rate was 57.37%.

Caste factor
In Bhonpur village, most of the villagers are from Schedule Caste (SC). Schedule Caste (SC) constitutes 51.00% while Schedule Tribe (ST) were 21.12% of total population in Bhonpur village.

Work Profile
In Bhonpur village out of total population, 1147 were engaged in work activities. 36.79% of workers describe their work as Main Work (Employment or Earning more than 6 Months) while 63.21% were involved in Marginal activity providing livelihood for less than 6 months. Of 1147 workers engaged in Main Work, 80 were cultivators (owner or co-owner) while 199 were Agricultural labourer.

Transport
Boinchi  is the nearest railway station of Bhonpur. Boinchi-Kalna road ( STATE HIGHWAY NO 11 ) passed through edge of this village.

Festivals
Durga Puja, Lakshmi Puja, Sarswati Puja is the main festivals here. Moreover, a local festival named Padmabati Jhanpan also occurs.

Economy
Most of the villagers are cultivators. There is a rice mill in the village. Its name is Malati Rice Mill. It is established in 2013.

References
http://www.census2011.co.in/data/village/324755-bhonpur-west-bengal.html

Villages in Hooghly district